The Company Chemists’ Association was established in 1898.  It aims to influence policy and support market development for its members, all large businesses.  

It now has 8 members:  Asda, Boots UK, Lloydspharmacy, Wm Morrison Supermarkets, Rowlands Pharmacy, Superdrug, Tesco and Well Pharmacy. Together they own over 6,500 pharmacies - almost 50% of the pharmacies in the United Kingdom. 

It speaks for its members in relation to government proposals which impact on pharmacies.

It was involved in the joint project, Pharmacy Voice, with the National Pharmacy Association and the Association of Independent Multiple Pharmacies. It was closed in April 2017.

Malcolm Harrison, a former senior manager at Boots UK, was appointed chief executive in March 2018. 

In February 2022 the association produced a study showing that there was a shortage of 3,000 community pharmacists in England, largely because of the recruitment of  pharmacists to primary care networks.

There were more than 20,000 instances of reported temporary pharmacy closures in England between October 2021 and September 2022. Most were from pharmacy branches owned by bigger companies. The association said this was because the demand for pharmacists in England was outstripping supply, although this explanation was contested.

References

Pharmacy organisations in the United Kingdom
Pharmaceutical industry trade groups
Organizations established in 1898